Brigadier General Frank Hawse Schwable (July 18, 1908 – October 28, 1988) was a decorated U.S. Marine pilot whose prosecution for collaborating with his Korean captors while a prisoner of war was dismissed in 1954.

Biography

Schwable, the son of a marine colonel who served thirty years, graduated from the U.S. Naval Academy in 1929. He was awarded the Cross of Valor by the Nicaraguan government in 1932. In September 1933, he was among 19 aviators representing the Marine Corps at the International Air Races in Chicago. He received the Legion of Merit for his service in World War II.
Colonel 
While chief of staff of the First Marine Air Wing, Colonel Schwable and his co-pilot were reported missing on a combat mission in Korea in July 1952. On February 23, 1953, the Chinese broadcast charges that two officers, Schwable and his co-pilot, had said that the U.S. was conducting germ warfare. Schwable was quoted saying the purpose was "to test under field conditions various elements of bacteriological warfare and possibly to expand field tests at a later date into an element of regular combat operations." When Schwable was quoted confessing to germ warfare, his wife said, "That's the same old Communist malarkey. Nobody believes it."

United Nations commander General Mark W. Clark denounced China's germ warfare charges. Clark said, "Whether these statements ever passed the lips of these unfortunate men is doubtful. If they did, however, too familiar are the mind-annihilating methods of these Communists in extorting whatever words they want ... The men themselves are not to blame, and they have my deepest sympathy for having been used in this abominable way."

Schwable was released from captivity in September 1953. On April 27, 1954, Marine Corps commandant General Lemuel C. Shepherd Jr. said he was "an instrument, however unwilling, of causing damage to his country" by the false confession that he later repudiated. At the board of inquiry that considered whether he merited court-martial, a recently released POW testified. He described how he was tortured during six months' captivity and said that in prosecuting Schwable they would be "persecut[ing] a man who has already been persecuted [and] would merely be playing into Communist hands." Dr. Winfred Overholser, former president of the American Psychiatric Association and longtime superintendent of St. Elizabeths Hospital, a federal mental facility, testified on his behalf.

The court of inquiry ultimately recommended no action against Schwable, but he was shifted, according to Shepherd, to "duties of a type making minimum demands upon the elements of unblemished personal example and leadership." On May 11 he was assigned to serve as the Marine Corps representative on the Navy's Flight Safety Board based in the Pentagon. The Marine Corps awarded Colonel Schwable its Legion of Merit for a third time on June 22, 1954, for his service as chief of staff to General Clayton C. Jerome in Korea for three months before his capture.

Schwable retired on June 30, 1959, as a brigadier general. He died on October 28, 1988, and is buried in Ebenezer Cemetery, Loudoun County, Virginia.

Decorations

Notes

External links
[https://web.archive.org/web/20101116220057/http://www.time.com/time/magazine/article/0,9171,819821,00.html "The Marines Decide". Time. May 10, 1954.

1908 births
1988 deaths
United States Naval Academy alumni
United States Marine Corps generals
United States Naval Aviators
American prisoners of war in the Korean War
United States Marine Corps personnel of World War II
United States Marine Corps personnel of the Korean War
Recipients of the Legion of Merit
Recipients of the Distinguished Flying Cross (United States)
Recipients of the Air Medal
Shot-down aviators